Hermathena may refer to:

 Hermathena (composite of Hermes and Athena), a Janus-like bust of Hermes and Athena
 Hermathena (journal), an academic journal of the classical world published by Trinity College Dublin
 Hermathena (butterfly), a genus of butterfly in the family Riodinidae
 Hermathena oweni, a species of butterfly in genus Hermathena of the family Riodinidae
 Hermathena candidata, a species of butterfly in genus Hermathena of the family Riodinidae
 Hermathena eburna, a species of butterfly in genus Hermathena of the family Riodinidae
 Hermathena longwing, a species of butterfly (Heliconius hermathena) of the family Nymphalidae